Ishtiaq Ibrahim (born 2 December 1969) is a Pakistani jurist who has been Justice of the Peshawar High Court since 11 August 2016.

References

1969 births
Living people
Judges of the Peshawar High Court
Pakistani judges
Place of birth missing (living people)